The British Virgin Islands competed at the 2015 Pan American Games in Toronto, Ontario, Canada from July 10 to 26, 2015. The Chef de mission of the team was Xavier Dag Samuels.

A final squad of six athletes (two men and four women) in three sports was announced on June 18, 2015 by the British Virgin Islands Olympic Committee. This marked the doubling of the number of athletes the nation sent to the last edition of the games in 2011. Squash athlete Joseph Chapman was the flagbearer for the team during the opening ceremony.

The British Virgin Islands did not medal at the games, continuing its drought as one of two nations (along with Aruba) to never win a Pan American Games medal.

Competitors
The following table lists British Virgin Islands's delegation per sport and gender.

Athletics

The British Virgin Islands qualified four athletes.

Men
Field Events

Women
Track events

Field Events

Key
Note – Ranks given for track events are for the entire round
Q = Qualified for the next round
SB = Seasonal Best
N/A = Round not applicable for the event
NM = No mark

Squash

The British Virgin Islands received a reallocated men's wildcard slot.

Swimming

The British Virgin Islands received a wild card to enter one female swimmer.

Women

See also
British Virgin Islands at the 2016 Summer Olympics

References

Nations at the 2015 Pan American Games
P
2015